Chin Harn Tong alias Chee Han Tong (born 8 September 1937) is a former Singaporean politician. A member of the ruling People's Action Party, Chin was a Member of Parliament for Aljunied SMC and later Aljunied GRC. In 1996, Chin retired from politics after 24 years.

Early life 
Chin was born into a Hainanese family. He was a teacher at now-defunct Kiau Nam School between 1957 and 1961, and briefly taught at Chung Hwa Girls' High School in 1964. He was awarded the Public Administration Medal (Bronze) and the Friend of Labour Award by NTUC in 1971.

Career 
After leaving his teaching career, Chin joined the labour movement in Singapore. He was Assistant Director at NTUC Research Unit between 1970 and 1978 and subsequently Executive Director and Advisor of NTUC COMFORT from 1978 to 1986.

In 1972, Chin ran for parliament as a PAP candidate in Aljunied SMC. He defeated candidates from the Workers' Party and the United National Front by winning 71.5% of the votes. In 1976, Chin ran for re-election in the same constituency, this time competing against Lim Kang Chew of the Workers' Party. Chin was re-elected with 74.9% of the votes won.  In 1980, Chin faced United Front's Sim Peng Kim and won 84.6% of the votes. The Aljunied SMC seat was uncontested in the 1984 General Election and Chin returned to parliament. 

In the 1988 General Election, the GRC system was introduced. Aljunied SMC became part of 3-person Aljunied GRC. The PAP team consisted of Chin, Wan Hussin bin Zoohri, and future Foreign Minister George Yeo. They faced a challenge from the SDP team of Mohamed Jufrie, Neo Choon Aik, and Ashleigh Seow. The PAP team defeated the SDP team by winning 56.33% of the votes. In the 1991 General Election, Aljunied GRC was uncontested and Chin returned to parliament; this would be his last election before retiring. Chin chaired the Aljunied Town Council from 1989 to 1993.

Chin became Political Secretary and later Parliamentary Secretary for Home Affairs between 1977 and 1981. He rose to become Senior Parliamentary Secretary for Home Affairs between 1981 and 1988.

After his retirement from politics, Chin was appointed a Justice of the Peace in 1998.

References 

People's Action Party politicians

Living people
1938 births
Singaporean people of Chinese descent
Members of the Parliament of Singapore